The Nye County Mercantile Company Building is a historic building located at 147 Main St. in Tonopah, Nevada. The two-story concrete block building was constructed in 1905. While concrete blocks were a popular building material in the era, the building was one of the first in Tonopah to be built with the blocks. Businessman Henry C. Cutting built the building to house his mercantile business. Cutting opened the first mercantile business in Tonopah; he reorganized the business as the Nye County Mercantile Company when he constructed its new building.

The building was added to the National Register of Historic Places on May 20, 1982.

References

Tonopah, Nevada
Buildings and structures in Nye County, Nevada
Commercial buildings completed in 1905
Commercial buildings on the National Register of Historic Places in Nevada
National Register of Historic Places in Tonopah, Nevada
1905 establishments in Nevada